Genuine Games was a British computer game development company based in Scotland.  Its biggest title was 50 Cent: Bulletproof, which sold over 2 million units.

Genuine Games was founded in early 1998 by David Broadhurst, Steven Batiste, and Russ Gubler. The company was a key contributor to the development of Knockout Kings from EA Sports.

References 

Defunct video game companies of the United Kingdom
Video game development companies
Video game companies established in 1998